Janski Beeeats (also known as Janski, born Jean-Sébastien Vermalle) is a French illustrator, music producer and DJ, best known for his electro hero persona. Vermalle won the title of "Best Electro Newcomer" at Printemps de Bourges in 2010, and has also made appearances at Sakifo Music Festival in Saint-Pierre, Réunion.

In 2017, he wrote the title theme to the French sci-fi drama series Missions

In 2018 under the name Janski, he signs a comics called Janski Beeeats, dealing with his music's themes.

Discography

Game Planet (EP) (2010)
Janski Beeeats (12") (2010)
Taaape#1: Home Made Tracks & Remixes (2011)
Noxxebots Carnage (EP) (2012)
Tales Of Tower City (EP) (2014)
The Beeeast (EP) (2014)
INVISIBLE (EP) (2015)
Horoscope (EP) (2018)

References

External links
DJ & Sound For Wedding & Corporate Events

French DJs